The College of Agriculture in Gonbad was first established as a junior college in 1985 in the city of Gonbad-e Qabus, Iran. The junior college changed into the Gonbad College in 1999, an upgrade in terms of organizational level. Associate degree courses in several fields such as crop production and technology, forest technology, range and watershed management, wood technology, fisheries and animal sciences are offered at the college. The college possesses a farmland covering around 200 hectares for training and research purposes.

Buildings and structures in Golestan Province
Agricultural universities and colleges
Universities in Iran
Agriculture in Iran
Education in Golestan Province